Gunnar Richard Bernhard Bärlund (9 January 1911 – 2 August 1982) was a Finnish heavyweight boxer who won the European amateur title in 1934. He competed in the 1932 Summer Olympics, but lost in the first round to the eventual winner Santiago Lovell.

In 1934 Bärlund turned professional and in 1936 moved to the United States, where he fought until retiring from boxing in 1948. He eventually became an American citizen, and died in Palm Beach, Florida in 1982. In 1991, his statue was erected in Helsinki. His niece Tutu Sohlberg is a retired Olympic equestrian.

References

1911 births
1982 deaths
Sportspeople from Helsinki
People from Uusimaa Province (Grand Duchy of Finland)
Heavyweight boxers
Olympic boxers of Finland
Boxers at the 1932 Summer Olympics
Finnish emigrants to the United States
Finnish male boxers